is a 1983 Japanese drama film directed by Seijirō Kōyama. It was entered into the 13th Moscow International Film Festival where Yoshi Katō won the award for Best Actor.

Cast
 Yoshi Katō as Denzo
 Hiroyuki Nagato as Denroku
 Tokue Hanazawa as Shop owner
 Fumie Kashiyama as Hana
 Kirin Kiki as Yoshi
 Kōjirō Kusanagi as Masa
 Gin Maeda as Teacher Tani
 Nana Okada as Fuku
 Saburō Shinoda as Denzo as a young man
 Hiromitsu Suzuki as Sugiyama

References

External links
 

1983 films
1983 drama films
Japanese drama films
1980s Japanese-language films
Films directed by Seijirō Kōyama
1980s Japanese films